A blind item is a news story, typically in a gossip column, in which the details of the matter are reported while the identities of the people involved are not revealed. The invention of the blind item is credited to William d'Alton Mann (1839–1920), publisher of Town Topics, who often used it for blackmail. Communication privacy management theory relates to the ideas of information privacy that influence this form of communication.

The advent of gossip websites brought about more public debate and speculation about the individual blind item stories, and also about the ethics surrounding the practice. Audiences might use blind item material as a shared topic of conversation with peers, and perhaps even as a conversational entry point to a sensitive topic that is personal to them.

See also
Circular sourcing
Defamation
Innuendo
Roman à clef
Rumor
De-identification
Anonymization

References

Newswriting